Pedro Hugo López (25 October 1927 – 26 October 1959) was a Chilean footballer. He played in two matches for the Chile national football team in 1952. He was also part of Chile's squad for the 1949 South American Championship.

References

External links
 

1927 births
1959 deaths
Chilean footballers
Chile international footballers
Place of birth missing
Association football forwards
Colo-Colo footballers
Universidad de Chile footballers
Unión Española footballers
Unión La Calera footballers